The 2014 U.S. F2000 Cooper Tires Winterfest was the fourth year of the winter racing series promoted by the U.S. F2000 National Championship. It consisted of six races held during two race meets during February 2014 and serves as preparation for the 2014 U.S. F2000 National Championship. Both venues are new for 2014 as the series previously raced on tracks in the state of Florida for the Winterfest.

American R. C. Enerson captured a closely contested title over Brit Michael Epps, with each driver capturing two wins and two other podium finishes. American rookie Jake Eidson finished third in points as the only driver to finish in the top-five in every race. Victor Franzoni won the first race but had two retirements and a DNS and fell to seventh in points and Clarke Toppe won the third race but it was his only top-five finish of the series as he finished fifth in points, six points behind Florian Latorre.

Drivers and teams

Race calendar and results
The series schedule, along with the other Road to Indy series', was announced on October 24, 2013.

Championship standings

Drivers' Championship

Teams'

References

External links
U.S. F2000 National Championship official website

U.S. F2000 National Championship seasons
U.S. F2000 Winterfest
U.S. F2000 Winterfest
U.S. F2000 Winterfest
U.S. F2000 Winterfest